HMNZS Manawanui was a naval tug which was modified for use as a diving tender by the Royal New Zealand Navy (RNZN). Originally intended for service with the United States Navy as a tug, the vessel was built in 1945 and transferred to the New Zealand Marine Department, which employed her in Waitemata Harbour before transferring the ship to the RNZN in 1948. She was converted to a diving tender in 1953 and served out her time in the RNZN in this role, before being decommissioned in 1978 and sold to the Paeroa Historic Maritime Park. The engine is now on display at the Whangarei Stationary Engine Club.

Construction and design
She had a crew of four.

Operational history
The vessel was originally built for the United States Navy, and was designated as US Navy tug YLT622, but instead she was transferred to the New Zealand Marine Department who named her Tug 622 and used her to service the large post-war fleet of surplus ships scattered around Waitemata Harbour. In 1948, Tug 622 was transferred to the RNZN and became HMNZS Manawanui. Manawanui was the first of three boats with this name to serve in the New Zealand Navy. It is also a Māori word meaning "to be brave or steadfast".

In 1953, she was converted to a diving tender and functioned in this role for the next 15 years. In 1956, she assisted in recovering an Avenger aircraft that had ditched in Hauraki Gulf. In 1957, she towed the badly damaged patrol launch SDML P3561 off rocks near Rangipukea Island and beached her in a nearby bay. In 1958, she investigated the wreck of the coaster Holmglen off Timaru.

She was replaced as a diving tender by a specially modified Moa class boat with the same name in 1978. In November 1978, she was sold for a nominal sum, to the Paeroa Historic Maritime Park for preservation and display.

See also
 Diving tenders of the Royal New Zealand Navy

Notes

References
 McDougall, R J  (1989) New Zealand Naval Vessels. Page 138-141. Government Printing Office. 

Auxiliary ships of the Royal New Zealand Navy
Ships built in New Zealand
1945 ships